Jonetani Ralulu (born 30 September 1986 in Sigatoka, Fiji) is a Fijian rugby union player. He plays Fly-half for Fiji on international level. Ralulu also plays for the province, Nadroga.

Playing at fly-half for the Stallions during the Colonial Cup, Ralulu went on to feature for the Air Pacific Fiji Warriors in the IRB Pacific Rugby Cup. Held the record as the youngest player to feature in a Colonial Cup final when he finished on the winning side with the Stallions in 2007.

International career

Ralulu made his debut for Fiji in 2008 against Samoa in the Pacific Nations Cup. He then was named in the sides 2012 end of year tour campaign. Ralulu took part in three out of the four matches, playing against Gloucester, Ireland XV and Georgia only missing the test against England.

Pld = Games Played, W = Games Won, D = Games Drawn, L = Games Lost, Tri = Tries Scored, Con = Conversions, Pen = Penalties, DG = Drop Goals, Pts = Points Scored

References

External links
espnscrum.com profile

Fiji international rugby union players
Fijian rugby union players
RCJ Farul Constanța players
CSM București (rugby union) players
Living people
1986 births
Rugby union fly-halves
Fijian expatriate rugby union players
Fijian expatriate sportspeople in France
Expatriate rugby union players in France
Expatriate rugby union players in Romania
Fijian expatriate sportspeople in Romania
People from Sigatoka
I-Taukei Fijian people